Subliminal Sounds is a Swedish record label founded in 1989, based in Stockholm.

Artists

Bo Axelzon & His Exotic Sounds
Baby Grandmothers
Backdoor Men
Dungen
Entheogens
Merrell Fankhauser
Peter Grudzien
D.R. Hooker
Abner Jay
Jade Stone & Luv
Kebnekajse
Life on Earth!
Lisa o Piu
LSD
Attileo Mineo
Mylla
Pärson Sound
Åke Sandin
S.T. Mikael
Stefan
The Stomachmouths
Tonebenders
Träd, Gräs & Stenar
The Works
Tom Zacharias

External links
Official website

See also
List of record labels

Indie rock record labels
Swedish independent record labels